Loyola College, Manvi, was founded by the Society of Jesus in Karnataka, India, in 2012, in the Kalyan Karnataka region in Manvi, Raichur District. It is a coeducational institution and tries to maintain a large enrollment of girls.

Courses 
The college is affiliated to Gulbarga University and since 2021, Raichur University. It offers degrees in the arts (BA), in commerce (B.Com.) and in science (B.Sc.) and well as M.Com., approved in the year 2021-22 by the government of Karnataka. 
Loyola Institute of Research and Innovative Studies (LIRIS) was founded in 2019.

Facilities
Facilities include a playground, laboratory, computer center, health center, indoor basketball court, hostels for gents and ladies and a guest house.

See also
 List of Jesuit sites

References 

Jesuit development centres
Colleges in Karnataka
Jesuit universities and colleges in India
Universities and colleges in Raichur district
Educational institutions established in 2012
2012 establishments in Karnataka